Sophie Berg Pagay (22 April 1860 – 23 January 1937) was an Austrian stage and film actress, born in Brünn, Austria-Hungary. She began acting as a child, and went to Berlin to perform on stage in 1887. She married actor Hans Pagay.

Selected filmography
 The Picture of Dorian Gray (1917)
 Carmen (1918)
 Intoxication (1919)
 A Drive into the Blue (1919)
 Mascotte (1920)
 Anna Boleyn (1920)
 The Forbidden Way (1920)
 Nobody Knows (1920)
 Lotte Lore (1921)
 Love at the Wheel (1921)
 The Eternal Struggle (1921)
 The House on the Moon (1921)
 The Blood (1922)
 Shame (1922)
 The Girl with the Mask (1922)
 His Excellency from Madagascar (1922)
 Tania, the Woman in Chains (1922)
 The Curse of Silence (1922)
 Louise de Lavallière (1922)
 Man by the Wayside (1923)
 By Order of Pompadour (1924)
 Darling of the King (1924)
 Cock of the Roost (1925)
 The Adventures of Sybil Brent (1925)
 People in Need (1925)
 The Girl with a Patron (1925)
 White Slave Traffic (1926)
 Cab No. 13 (1926)
 Professor Imhof (1926)
 The Good Reputation (1926)
 Her Husband's Wife (1926)
 The Sea Cadet (1926)
 The Woman in Gold (1926)
 A Sister of Six (1926)
 Sword and Shield (1926)
 Roses from the South (1926)
 The Last Waltz (1927)
 The Woman Who Couldn't Say No (1927)
 The Impostor (1927)
 The Tragedy of a Lost Soul (1927)
 On the Banks of the River Weser (1927)
 German Women - German Faithfulness (1927)
 The Long Intermission (1927)
 Weekend Magic (1927)
 The Girl Without a Homeland (1927)
 The False Prince (1927)
 The Transformation of Dr. Bessel (1927)
 Sir or Madam (1928)
 Mariett Dances Today (1928)
 When the Guard Marches (1928)
 The Harbour Baron (1928)
 Lemke's Widow (1928)
 Autumn on the Rhine (1928)
 Violantha (1928)
 The Saint and Her Fool (1928)
 The Duty to Remain Silent (1928)
 Painted Youth (1929)
 Bobby, the Petrol Boy (1929)
 It's You I Have Loved (1929)
 Fire in the Opera House (1930)
 Mach' mir die Welt zum Paradies (1930)
 The Son of the White Mountain (1930)
 End of the Rainbow (1930)
 Scandal on Park Street (1932)
 Three Bluejackets and a Blonde (1933)
 The Sun Rises (1934)
 Make Me Happy (1935)

References

Bibliography
 
 

1860 births
1937 deaths
Actors from Brno
People from the Margraviate of Moravia
Austrian Jews
Austrian film actresses
Austrian silent film actresses
Austrian stage actresses
20th-century Austrian actresses
19th-century Austrian actresses
Austrian people of Moravian-German descent